Weishi may refer to:

Weishi County, in Henan, China
Weishi Rockets, Chinese multiple launch rocket systems
Cheng Weishi Lun, comprehensive commentary on Vasubandhu's seminal Yogacara work Triṃśikā-vijñaptimātratā
Yogacara, or Wei Shi in Chinese, a school of Buddhist philosophy and psychology emphasizing phenomenology and ontology